Nicholas Perry (born May 19, 1992), known online as Nikocado Avocado, is a Ukrainian-born American Internet celebrity best known for his mukbang videos on YouTube. , he has accumulated more than 7 million subscribers and approximately 1.8 billion total views across six YouTube channels.

Personal life and musical career
Nicholas Perry was born on May 19, 1992, in Ukraine. He was adopted in infancy by an American family and was raised in Philadelphia, Pennsylvania. 

Perry majored in performance in college. Between 2011 and 2012, Perry made a living as a freelance violinist and a Home Depot worker, and moved to New York City in 2013 to pursue his dream of playing in a Broadway orchestra. However, he found it difficult to make a living in a city surrounded by other talented musicians.

According to a 2016 video, Perry first met Orlin Home through a vegan Facebook group. After months of online communication, Home traveled from Colombia to meet Perry at the Woodstock Fruit Festival. They began a relationship after traveling together in Central America, and, in early 2014, Perry left his musical career to settle down with Home in Colombia.

Internet career
Home, who already had a YouTube channel, first encouraged Perry to start his own in 2014. His channel, named Nikocado Avocado, then consisted of vegan and lifestyle vlogs, as well as musical performances. On September 1, 2016, Perry released a video explaining why he no longer wanted to be a vegan YouTuber and his frustrations with the vegan community, which he described as “unbalanced, hostile and mentally unstable”.

From 2016 onwards, Perry began filming mukbang videos, becoming one of the first American men to partake in the trend, with his first mukbang video reaching 50,000 views in a couple of weeks. His earlier mukbang videos showed his pet parrot sitting on his shoulder while he ate.

Perry appeared on Comedy Central's Tosh.0 in 2018. He also has a presence on platforms other than YouTube, such as Cameo, TikTok, Twitter, Facebook, Instagram, Patreon, and OnlyFans. He says he has had manic episodes due to his poor diet, and that he takes advantage of his low moments by using clickbait to encourage views to his videos.

In a 2019 interview, Perry said he only plans on creating mukbang videos "for a couple more years" and that "it is very unhealthy". Numerous emotionally turbulent videos uploaded by Perry have also led people to question the state of his mental health. On September 18, 2021, he claimed that he had fractured his ribs after months of "excessive, forceful coughing".

According to Perry's interview with MEL Magazine in 2021, many of his online conflicts are self-orchestrated for the benefit of his career, citing his past education in performance arts and his desire to play the role of the villain.

Controversies
In December 2019, Perry was accused by mukbanger Stephanie Soo of harassing her by sending her text messages and taking photos from inside her home. Perry published a response video disputing her statements, in which he displayed the photos he took and argued that Soo was fully aware of them being taken. He also showed their text conversations, stating that Soo had stood him up for a scheduled collaboration. Zach Choi, a fellow mukbanger who once joined Perry and Soo in a collaboration, later stated that he had hired an attorney to address Perry's statements, though no legal action ever took place. Perry later said that he and Soo had faked the feud to benefit their careers.

Due to Perry's sharp weight gain in recent years, many fans and YouTubers have been concerned about his health. In 2019, Perry told Men's Health that he suffers from erectile dysfunction and a loss of libido as a result of his binge eating. In 2021, he told his viewers that he is classed as disabled and rides a mobility scooter. He is sometimes seen wearing a CPAP mask, a device designed for individuals with sleep apnea, in his videos.

Notes

References

External links
 

1992 births
People from Kherson
20th-century American LGBT people
21st-century American LGBT people
American male violinists
American YouTubers
American gay men
LGBT YouTubers
Living people
Vlogs-related YouTube channels
YouTube channels launched in 2011
YouTube controversies
YouTube vloggers
OnlyFans creators
Internet memes